Pfaffenhofen is a Landkreis (district) in Bavaria, Germany. It is bounded by (from the south and clockwise) the districts of Eichstätt, Kelheim, Freising, Dachau and Neuburg-Schrobenhausen, and the city of Ingolstadt.

History
In early medieval times the region was partially property of the powerful monasteries of Ilmmünster and Münchsmünster, and partially divided into tiny secular states. One of those states was the county of Scheyern. The counts were ancestors of the Wittelsbach family, who in 1180 became rulers of Bavaria. From that time on the region was a part of Bavaria.

The district of Pfaffenhofen was established in 1972 by merging several former districts.

Geography
The district is located in the Hallertau Plains between the Isar and Danube rivers. The Danube crosses the northernmost part of the district.

Coat of arms
The coat of arms displays:
 the white and blue lozenges of Bavaria
 a cross symbolising the monastery of Scheyern
 a branch of hops

Towns and municipalities

Towns

Geisenfeld
Pfaffenhofen an der Ilm
Vohburg

Municipalities

Baar-Ebenhausen
Ernsgaden
Gerolsbach
Hettenshausen
Hohenwart
Ilmmünster
Jetzendorf
Manching
Münchsmünster
Pörnbach
Reichertshausen
Reichertshofen
Rohrbach
Scheyern
Schweitenkirchen
Wolnzach

International cooperation
These are the official sister cities

References

External links
 Official website (German)

 
Districts of Bavaria